School Is Over is a 2010 Italian drama film directed by Valerio Jalongo. It was screened in competition at the 2010 Rome Film Festival and nominated for a Golden Marc'Aurelio Award. It was also nominated for the Silver Ribbon Award for Best Score by the Italian National Syndicate of Film Journalists in 2011.

Cast 
Valeria Golino as Daria Quarenghi
Vincenzo Amato as Aldo Talarico
Fulvio Forti as Alex Donadei
Antonella Ponziani as Serena Donadei
Marcello Mazzarella as Michele

References

External links

2010 films
Italian drama films
2010 drama films
Italian high school films
2010s Italian films